Zone Arena is an arena located at 164 Barbu Văcărescu Boulevard in Bucharest, Romania. Opened on 1 May 2010, Zone Arena is used for events such as concerts, exhibitions, fairs and shows.

Musical events
2010 Ozzy Osbourne, The Cranberries, Pink Martini, Faithless, Massive Attack, Gary Moore, Aerosmith, Reamonn, Bob Dylan, Goran Bregović, George Dalaras, etc.
2011 Scorpions, Roxette, etc. 
2012 Julio Iglesias, Megadeth, Mötley Crüe, Motörhead, Dimmu Borgir, etc.

External links

Music venues in Romania
Buildings and structures in Bucharest
Music venues completed in 2010